Snöstorp Nyhem FF is a Swedish football club located in Halmstad.

Background
Snöstorp Nyhem FF currently plays in Division 3 Halland Elit which is the fifth tier of Swedish football. They play their home matches at the Snöstorps IP in Halmstad.

The club is affiliated to Hallands Fotbollförbund. Snöstorp Nyhem FF have competed in the Svenska Cupen on 21 occasions and have played 43 matches in the competition.

Season to season

Footnotes

External links
 Snöstorp Nyhem FF – Official website

Football clubs in Halland County